Norris Creek is a stream in Henry and Johnson Counties in the U.S. state of Missouri. It is a tributary of Big Creek.

Norris Creek has the name of William Norris, the proprietor of a mill along its course.

See also
List of rivers of Missouri

References

Rivers of Henry County, Missouri
Rivers of Johnson County, Missouri
Rivers of Missouri